Bilal Benkhedim (born 20 April 2001) is a French professional footballer who plays as a midfielder for  club Le Puy.

Club career
On 13 February 2018, Benkhedim signed his first professional contract with Saint-Étienne. He made his professional debut with Saint-Étienne in a 0–0 Ligue 1 tie with Montpellier on 24 November 2019.

On 7 December 2022, Benkhedim signed with Le Puy.

International career
Benkhedim was born in France to an Algerian father and Moroccan mother. He is a youth international for France.

References

External links
 
 
 
 

2001 births
Living people
People from Bagnols-sur-Cèze
French footballers
France youth international footballers
French sportspeople of Algerian descent
French sportspeople of Moroccan descent
Association football midfielders
Nîmes Olympique players
Montpellier HSC players
ES Uzès Pont du Gard players
FC Bagnols Pont players
AC Avignonnais players
Olympique Alès players
AS Saint-Étienne players
Le Puy Foot 43 Auvergne players
Ligue 1 players
Championnat National 2 players
Championnat National 3 players
Footballers from Occitania (administrative region)